Christopher Desmond Stynes (born January 19, 1973) is a former Major League Baseball utility player.

Early life
Christopher Desmond Stynes was born in Queens, New York, and attended Boca Raton Community High School in Florida. He attended Florida Atlantic University.

His grandfather Joe Stynes won the 1923 All-Ireland Senior Football Championship; his cousin Jim Stynes was a legend for the Melbourne Football Club in the Australian Football League.

Career
Among the Minor League Baseball teams that he played for was the Knoxville Smokies (now the Tennessee Smokies).

He played in the majors from 1995 to 2004 for the Kansas City Royals, Cincinnati Reds, Chicago Cubs, Boston Red Sox, Colorado Rockies, Pittsburgh Pirates, and Baltimore Orioles. 
 
Noted for his base-running speed, he managed to steal 3 consecutive bases in a single inning (second, third and then home-plate) while a member of the Kansas City Royals on May 12, during an 8–5 win against the Seattle Mariners.

In the 1997 season, Stynes had 7 hits in his first 7 at bats, setting an MLB record for most consecutive hits to start a season. The record was broken in 2021 by Yermín Mercedes, who went 8-for-8 to start the 2021 season.

Stynes missed nearly a month of play during the 2001 season after a pitch from Aaron Sele hit Stynes in the cheek, breaking the cheekbone in two places.

References

External links

1973 births
Living people
Colorado Rockies players
Pittsburgh Pirates players
Boston Red Sox players
Chicago Cubs players
Kansas City Royals players
Cincinnati Reds players
Major League Baseball third basemen
Major League Baseball second basemen
Major League Baseball outfielders
Dunedin Blue Jays players
Gulf Coast Blue Jays players
Knoxville Smokies players
Myrtle Beach Hurricanes players
Omaha Royals players
Indianapolis Indians players
Pawtucket Red Sox players
People from Queens, New York
Baseball players from New York City
Chris
Boca Raton Community High School alumni